Luff or luffing may refer to:

People
 Arthur P. Luff (1855–1938), British physician and forensic scientist
 Harry Luff (1856-1916), American Major League Baseball player
 Jennifer D. Luff, American historian
 John N. Luff (1860–1938), American philatelist
 Matt Luff (born 1997), professional ice hockey player 
 Peter Luff (born 1955), British politician
 Peter Luff (campaigner) (born 1946)
 Robyn Luff, (born 1980), Canadian politician

Other uses
 Lausanne Underground Film and Music Festival (LUFF), Lausanne, Switzerland
 Level luffing crane, a type of crane where the jib, rather than being fixed, can be raised and lowered
 Luffing, when a sailing sheet is eased so far past trim that airflow over the surface is disrupted
 The leading edge of a sail